The Secretary of Defense Medal for Outstanding Public Service is the second highest award presented by the Secretary of Defense to non-career Federal employees, private citizens, and foreign nationals for contributions, assistance, or support to Department of Defense functions that are extensive enough to warrant recognition, but are lesser in scope and impact than is required for the DoD Medal for Distinguished Public Service.  The Secretary of Defense is the approval authority.  This award consists of a silver medal, a miniature medal, a rosette, and a citation signed by the Secretary of Defense.  An individual may receive this award more than once.  Subsequent awards consist of the foregoing recognition devices and a bronze, silver, or gold palm, as appropriate.

Notable recipients 

 David S. Alberts
 Richard Armitage
 David J. Barron
 Steven G. Bradbury
 Carl Brashear
 Laura Bush
 Hillary Clinton
 Natalie Crawford
 Michele Flournoy
 Brett Giroir
 Robert L. Gordon III
 Mariusz Handzlik
 William A. Jeffrey
 Deborah Lee James
 Jill Kelley
 Zalmay Khalilzad
 Jacques Paul Klein
 Zachary J. Lemnios
 MITRE Corporation
 Michael P. Mulroy
 Walter Oi
 Elissa Slotkin
 James B. Thayer
J. Glenn Morris
Thomas Mooney

See also 
Awards and decorations of the United States government

References

External links 
US Department of Defense

Awards and decorations of the United States Department of Defense